Abdollahabad-e Yek (also Romanized as ‘Abdollāhābād-e Yek; also known as ‘Abdollāhābād) is a village in Mashiz Rural District, in the Central District of Bardsir County, Kerman Province, Iran. At the 2006 census, its population was 20, in 6 families.

References 

Populated places in Bardsir County